Apple Green may refer to:

Apple green, a colour
"Apple Green", a song by Milltown Brothers from the 1991 album Slinky
"Apple Green", a song by Mother Earth from the 1993 album The People Tree
"Apple Green", a song by June Valli (1960)
Ken Green (basketball, born 1959), who went by the nickname “Apple” Green

See also
Applegreen, Irish operator of filling stations
Amy Applegren